Kenneth Vennor Morris (31 July 1879 – 21 April 1937), sometimes using the Welsh form of his name Cenydd Morus, was a Welsh author and theosophist. Born in South Wales, he relocated to London with his family as a child, and was educated at Christ's Hospital. In 1896 he lived in Dublin for a while, where he became friends with George William Russell. From 1908 to 1930 Morris lived in California as a staffperson of the Theosophical Society headquarters at Point Loma. The last seven years of his life were spent back in his native Wales, during which time he founded seven Welsh theosophical lodges. Morris was a friend of Talbot Mundy, and the two writers often commentated on each other's work in magazine The Theosophical Path.

According to Ursula K. Le Guin, Morris is one of the three master prose stylists of fantasy of the 20th century, together with E. R. Eddison and J. R. R. Tolkien.

Works
The Fates of the Princes of Dyfed (1914) As Cenydd Morus.
The Secret Mountain and Other Tales (1926)
Book of the Three Dragons (1930)
The Chalchiuhite Dragon: A Tale of Toltec Times (1992)
The Dragon Path: Collected Tales of Kenneth Morris (1995)

Notes

References
Anderson, Douglas A. (1992). "Afterword". In Kenneth Morris, The Chalchiuhite Dragon. Theosophical University Press. . Retrieved 28 October 2007.
Anderson, Douglas A. (February/March 1992). "The Coming of the God", Sunrise.
Anderson, Douglas A. (February/March 2005). "Book Review: Book of the Three Dragons ", Sunrise.
McCaffery, R.J. (Spring 2000). "Kenneth Morris (1879–1937)", Eye Dialect (Issue Two).

External links

Works online
 
 
The Fates of the Princes of Dyfed, online edition
The Chalchiuhite Dragon:A Tale of Toltec Times, online edition
Short stories, a play, and book excerpts. 

1879 births
1937 deaths
20th-century Welsh writers
People educated at Christ's Hospital
Welsh fantasy writers
Welsh Theosophists